The Urbasa Range (Urbasa mendilerroa in Basque and Sierra de Urbasa in Spanish) is a mountain range of western Navarre, Spain, part of the Basque Mountains. Its highest point is the 1,183-metre-high Baiza.

Urbasa is a karstic range where numerous nummulites fossils have been found.

Together with the neighboring Andia range, Urbasa is part of the Urbasa-Andia Natural Park.

Peaks 
 Baiza 1,183 m.
 Iruaitzeta 1,144 m. 
 Santa Marina 1,068 m. 
 Bargagain 1,157 m.

References

External links

Urbasa-Andia Natural Park

Basque Mountains
Mountains of Navarre